Pedro García Jr. (born 1 March 1953) is a Peruvian sports shooter. He competed at the 1980 Summer Olympics and the 1984 Summer Olympics.

References

External links
 

1953 births
Living people
Peruvian male sport shooters
Olympic shooters of Peru
Shooters at the 1980 Summer Olympics
Shooters at the 1984 Summer Olympics
Place of birth missing (living people)
20th-century Peruvian people